Axel Liebmann  (3 August 1849 – 23 January 1876) was a Danish composer.

See also
List of Danish composers

References
This article was initially translated from the Danish Wikipedia.

1849 births
1876 deaths
Male composers
19th-century Danish composers
19th-century male musicians
Burials at the Garrison Cemetery, Copenhagen